The 2014 Barum Czech Rally Zlín was the eighth round of the 2014 European Rally Championship season. The event was won by Václav Pech and Petr Uhel.

Results

References

2014 in Czech sport
2014 European Rally Championship season
Barum Rally Zlín